Sun-Up is a 1925 American silent drama film directed by Edmund Goulding based upon a successful 1924 play of the same name by Lula Vollmer. The film stars Lucille La Verne, replaying her successful New York stage role, Pauline Starke, and Conrad Nagel.

Plot
As described in a film magazine reviews, Rufe, the son of a murdered Appalachian moonshiner, outpoints his rival, Sheriff Weeks, when he marries Emmy before going to serve in the War. A deserter is concealed by Rufe’s mother and later she learns that he is the son of the murderer of her husband. When she is about to kill the stranger in cold blood, she is notified that her son has been killed in the war and that he would not commit such a deed. She permits the young man to make his escape.

Cast

Preservation
A print of Sun-Up is preserved by Metro-Goldwyn-Mayer in their studio library.

References

External links

Stills at silenthollywood.com
Lobby card at www.gettyimages.com

Films directed by Edmund Goulding
1925 films
Metro-Goldwyn-Mayer films
American silent feature films
1925 drama films
American black-and-white films
Silent American drama films
1920s American films